The 2003 season was one of the most successful seasons of Cienciano because the team won the 2003 Copa Sudamericana, the first Peruvian club international title.

Statistics

Last updated in January 2003.

|}

2003 Copa Sudamericana

Preliminary Chile/Peru

Quarter-finals

Semi-finals

Finals

Peruvian Primera División

Torneo Apertura

Torneo Clausura

Pre-Copa Sudamericana play-offs

Cienciano
2003 in Peruvian football